The thoracic spinal nerve 10 (T10) is a spinal nerve of the thoracic segment.

It originates from the spinal column from below the thoracic vertebra 10 (T10).

References

Spinal nerves